Fatmir Haxhiu (1927, in Gjirokastër – 2001) was an Albanian painter of the 20th century. Recipient of the People's Painter of Albania award, he belonged to the realist art stream.

Haxhiu studied at the Qemal Stafa High School.

References

1927 births
2001 deaths
People from Gjirokastër
20th-century Albanian painters
Qemal Stafa High School alumni
20th-century male artists
Albanian male painters